Charles Walter "Chuggy" Perchard (born 18 July 1992) is a Jersey international cricketer. In 2014 he played in the 2014 ICC World Cricket League Division Four. He was selected in the Jersey squad for the 2015 ICC World Twenty20 Qualifier tournament and the 2016 ICC World Cricket League Division Four matches held in Los Angeles.

For the 2017 ICC World Cricket League Division Five in September 2017, he was named as captain of the squad. In April 2018, he was also named as the captain of Jersey's squad for the 2018 ICC World Cricket League Division Four tournament in Malaysia. In August 2018, he was named as the captain of the team for the 2018–19 ICC World Twenty20 Europe Qualifier tournament in the Netherlands.

In May 2019, he was named as the captain of Jersey's squad for the 2019 T20 Inter-Insular Cup against Guernsey. He made his Twenty20 International (T20I) debut for Jersey against Guernsey on 31 May 2019. In the second match of the T20 Inter-Insular Cup, Perchard became the first bowler for Jersey to take a five-wicket haul in T20Is, finishing with five wickets for seventeen runs. The same month, he was named as the captain of Jersey's squad for the Regional Finals of the 2018–19 ICC T20 World Cup Europe Qualifier tournament in Guernsey.

In September 2019, he was named as the captain of Jersey's squad for the 2019 ICC T20 World Cup Qualifier tournament in the United Arab Emirates. He was the joint-leading wicket-taker for Jersey in the tournament, with seven dismissals in six matches.  In November 2019, he was named as the captain of Jersey's squad for the Cricket World Cup Challenge League B tournament in Oman. He made his List A debut, for Jersey against Uganda, on 2 December 2019.

In October 2021, Perchard was named the captain of Jersey's T20I team for the Regional Final of the 2021 ICC Men's T20 World Cup Europe Qualifier tournament. After successfully leading Jersey to victory in the regional qualifier, Perchard was named Channel Islands Sports Personality of the Year for 2021.

References

External links
 

1992 births
Living people
Jersey cricketers
Jersey Twenty20 International cricketers
Place of birth missing (living people)